
Murray's Hypocycloidal Engine, now in Thinktank, Birmingham Science Museum, England, was made around 1805 and is the world's third-oldest working steam engine and the oldest working engine with a Tusi couple hypocycloidal straight line mechanism.

History
Designed by Matthew Murray, and made by Fenton, Murray and Wood of Holbeck, Leeds, it is one of only two of the type to survive; the other is located at The Henry Ford, Michigan, United States.

The single-cylinder engine was used by John Bradley & Co of Stourbridge from 1805 until 1931, and by N. Hingley & Sons Ltd of Netherton from 1931 until 1961, when it was acquired by Birmingham City Council for their science museum.

Murray patented the hypocycloidal arrangement in 1802.

See also
 Birmingham Museums Trust
 Rotative beam engine
 Smethwick Engine – the oldest working engine in the world, also at Thinktank
 Sun and planet gear
 Whitbread Engine – the second-oldest working engine; one of the first rotative steam engines

Notes

References 

Preserved stationary steam engines
Collection of Thinktank, Birmingham
1805 in England
1805 in science
Articles containing video clips